Martin Cristian Kuittinen Zbijewski (born 24 November 1997) is a Finnish-Polish professional footballer who plays as a full-back, wing-back or winger for Zimbru.

Early life
Kuittinen was born in Hanko, Finland, to a Polish mother and a Finnish father, and he holds a dual citizenship of Finland and Poland.

Career

At the age of 15, Kuittinen debuted for Finnish side BK-46. In 2014, he joined the youth academy of Real Valladolid in the Spanish second tier after trialing for the youth academy of Spanish top flight club Real Madrid. Before the second half of 2016–17, he signed for Sintrense in the Portuguese third tier after trialing for German Bundesliga team Werder Bremen.

Before the 2019 season, Kuittinen signed for Víkingur Ólafsvík in the Icelandic second tier. In 2021, he signed for Moldovan top flight outfit Zimbru after trialing for Jagiellonia Białystok in Poland, where he made 5 league appearances and scored 1 goal. On 22 October 2021, Kuittinen debuted for Zimbru during a 1–2 loss to Dinamo-Auto.

References

External links
 

1. deild karla players
1997 births
Association football defenders
Association football midfielders
Bollklubben-46 players
Campeonato de Portugal (league) players
Expatriate footballers in Iceland
Expatriate footballers in Moldova
Expatriate footballers in Portugal
Expatriate footballers in Spain
FC Zimbru Chișinău players
Finnish expatriate footballers
Finnish expatriate sportspeople in Iceland
Finnish expatriate sportspeople in Moldova
Finnish expatriate sportspeople in Spain
Finnish footballers
Finnish people of Polish descent
Kakkonen players
Living people
Moldovan Super Liga players
People from Hanko
S.U. Sintrense players
Ungmennafélagið Víkingur players
Sportspeople from Uusimaa
Polish people of European descent